Girls is a 1919 American silent romantic comedy directed by Walter Edwards and starring Marguerite Clark. It is based on the 1909 Broadway play of the same name by Clyde Fitch starring Florence Reed in the part Clark plays in this film.

No prints of the film are known to exist and Girls is now presumed to be a lost film.

Plot
As described in a film magazine, Pamela Gordon (Clark) forms a man-haters club with her roommates Violet (Warren) and Kate (Chadwick). Edgar Holt (Ford), victim of a flirtatious married woman, takes refuge from an irate husband in the young woman's room just as the man-haters are going to bed. He is impressed with Pamela and pockets an advertisement for a position that he finds. Pamela is indignant and he escapes to another room. Later, Pamela, Holt and Wilbur Searles (Carewe) are present at the mountain home of a wealthy friend. Holt intercedes when Searles tries to make love to Pamela. While there, the pair are given a chance to become better acquainted, but Pamela is still haughty towards Holt and all men in general. Holt tells his law partner George H. Sprague (Persse) to answer Pamela's advertisement, and she is immediately given a position. Violet is also hired as a stenographer and, weakening on the man hating idea, falls in love with the head clerk. Sprague makes unwelcome advances on Pamela and she leaves, taking Violet with her. Meanwhile, Kate, the other member of the league, has secretly married her theatrical manager. Holt rents a room next to Pamela's to more easily court her. Violet announces her engagement and Kate then tells of her marriage. Holt knocks on the door but Pamela will not let him in. He goes around to a window, and, when he almost falls, Pamela drags him in with her arms around his neck. He puts his arms around her and she is compelled to admit that she loves him.

Cast

References

External links

Still with Harrison Ford and Marguerite Clark (University of Washington, Sayre collection)
lantern slide(archived)

1919 films
1919 romantic comedy films
American romantic comedy films
American silent feature films
American black-and-white films
Famous Players-Lasky films
American films based on plays
Films directed by Walter Edwards
Films set in New York City
Lost American films
Paramount Pictures films
Lost romantic comedy films
1910s American films
Silent romantic comedy films
Silent American comedy films